Scaevola nitida (common name - shining fanflower) is an erect shrub in the family Goodeniaceae, native to Western Australia. It grows to a height of 0.3 to 3 m, and its blue-purple flowers may be seen from August to December.

Description 
Scaevola nitida is a spreading shrub growing up to 3 m tall, glabrous, and is sticky when young. The leaves have no stalk and are obovate to narrowly elliptic, and toothed, with the leaf blade itself being from 2 to 8.7 cm long by 7–40 mm wide. The flowers occur in terminal spikes which are up to 6.5 cm long. The sepals are  rim-like and 0.3 mm high. The blue to lilac corolla is 13–20 mm long, pilose or glabrous outside, and bearded inside. The ovary is 2-locular. The grooved fruit is cylindrical and up to 4 mm long, and is smooth.

Distribution and habitat
It is found in the IBRA Regions of the Esperance Plains, the Geraldton Sandplains, the Jarrah Forest region, the Swan Coastal Plain, and the Warren biogeographic region, growing on white or grey sand and clay, in coastal limestone cliffs and dunes.

Taxonomy and etymology
It was first described and named by Robert Brown in 1810, and its specific epithet, nitida, is a Latin adjective meaning "shining".

References

nitida
Eudicots of Western Australia
Asterales of Australia
Plants described in 1810
Taxa named by Robert Brown (botanist, born 1773)